Jai Prakash Bhai Patel is an Indian politician. He was elected to the Jharkhand Legislative Assembly from Mandu (Vidhan Sabha constituency) as a member of the Bharatiya Janta Party. Patel is a son of late Tek Lal Mahto.

References 

Living people
Indian politicians
1982 births